Longistigma caryae, the giant bark aphid, is a species of giant aphid in the family Aphididae.

References

Further reading

External links

 

Insects described in 1841
Lachninae